Kenneth Frank McNeill Uttley (21 August 1913 – 15 June 1973) was a New Zealand cricketer who played for Otago, Canterbury and Wellington in his 37 first-class matches between 1933 and 1952. He was a right-handed opening batsman who scored 2,053 runs at an average of 31.10 in first-class cricket, including three centuries. His son Ian Uttley played for the New Zealand national rugby union team in 1963.

He captained Otago in 1937–38, when he was the highest scorer in the Plunket Shield, with 420 runs at an average of 70.00. In the second match, against Auckland, he scored 132 and 138. He won the Redpath Cup for New Zealand batsman of the season in 1937–38.

Uttley married Jessie Neill in Dunedin in January 1939. Later that year he qualified as a doctor at the University of Otago. From 1940 he trained as a pathologist at Christchurch Hospital, where he established the blood bank. He later worked at hospitals in Timaru and Palmerston North, where he died suddenly in 1973, aged 59.

See also
 List of Otago representative cricketers

References

1913 births
1973 deaths
New Zealand cricketers
Canterbury cricketers
Otago cricketers
Wellington cricketers
Cricketers from Oamaru
New Zealand pathologists
South Island cricketers